Forbesiocrinus is an extinct genus of crinoids.

Fossil records
This genus is known in the fossil records from the Devonian period to the Carboniferous period (age range: 370.6 to 342.8 million years ago). Fossils of species within this genus have been found in Belgium, Canada, United States, Australia and China.

References 

Sagenocrinida
Prehistoric crinoid genera
Paleozoic echinoderms of North America
Devonian first appearances
Carboniferous extinctions
Paleozoic life of Alberta